Hinojos is a town and municipality located in the province of Huelva, Spain. According to the 2005 census, it has a population of 3,726 inhabitants.

References

External links
Hinojos - Sistema de Información Multiterritorial de Andalucía

Municipalities in the Province of Huelva